L’Humanité Dimanche is a French language weekly magazine which is the supplement of l'Humanité newspaper. It has been distributed since 1948.

History and profile
L’Humanité Dimanche was established in 1948. At the end of the 1990s the magazine was closed. It was relaunched on 9 March 2006. It is a Sunday supplement of l'Humanité and has a communist political stance. It was previously affiliated with the Communist Party.

References

External links

1948 establishments in France
Communist magazines
French-language magazines
Magazines established in 1948
Magazines published in Paris
Newspaper supplements
Political magazines published in France
Sunday magazines
Weekly magazines published in France